Thirty Eight is the fourth studio album by Detroit-based hip hop producer Apollo Brown, released digitally on April 29, 2014 by Mello Music Group. The album was later released physically, on CD and vinyl, with their own bonus tracks. Apollo Brown described Thirty Eight as a ride through Detroit of the early 1980s, that was inspired by various 1970s and 1980s films' soundtracks. One single was released from the album, "The Answer", as a preorder bonus.

Album title
According to Apollo Brown, the album was named after .38 caliber revolver:

Critical reception

Thirty Eight received positive reviews from music critics. Exclaim! gave the album seven out of ten, saying that the album "carries an inference to the smoky, gritty sound of '70s soul while updating it with modernized production and hip-hop soul sensibilities" and commending Apollo Brown, who "gets better each time out". PopMatters also gave it seven out of ten, calling it "another win for Brown", but named lack of rappers as album's biggest weakness. "These beats are crying out for rappers," added the critic.

Track listing

Personnel
Credits adapted from Bandcamp:

 Apollo Brown – producer
 Michael Tolle – executive producer
 Matt "Magnetic" Oleksiak – mixing
 Eric Morgeson – mastering
 Sarah Mattmiller – design
 Austin Hart – creative director
 Corey Sheridan – digital advisor
 Joe Dent – physical advisor
 Matt Conaway – media advisor

References

External links
 

2014 albums
Albums produced by Apollo Brown
Instrumental hip hop albums
Mello Music Group albums